Allison Schroeder is an American screenwriter. She co-wrote the film Hidden Figures with Theodore Melfi, earning a nomination for the Academy Award for Best Adapted Screenplay.

Early and personal life
Schroeder graduated from Melbourne High School in Florida in 1997. While in high school, she interned at NASA, where her grandparents worked. She majored in economics at Stanford University, and after working as a consultant for two years, she went to University of Southern California to earn a Masters of Fine Arts in the Film Production Program.

In 2016, Schroeder married writer Aaron Brownstein. They have a daughter, Emily, born in 2016.

Filmography

Film and television

Awards and nominations
For - Hidden Figures (with Theodore Melfi)
Nominated: Academy Award for Best Adapted Screenplay 
Nominated: BAFTA Award for Best Screenplay
Nominated: USC Scripter Award
Nominated: Satellite Award for Best Adapted Screenplay
Nominated: Writers Guild of America Award for Best Adapted Screenplay
Winner:  Humanitas Prize for Feature Film (tied with Hacksaw Ridge)

References

External links

Year of birth missing (living people)
Living people
American women screenwriters
American writers
American screenwriters
Melbourne High School alumni
Screenwriters from Florida
Stanford University alumni
University of Southern California alumni
21st-century American women